Prunus pedunculata is a species of Prunus known in China as longpeduncled almond (长梗扁桃). It is native to China (particularly the Inner Mongolia Autonomous Region), Mongolia and nearby sections of Siberia. A small bush, reaching 1-2m, its pink flowers allow it to be used as an ornamental. Adapted to cold, arid environments, its manystemmed growth habit fixes blowing sand, an important contribution to succession. As Amygdalus pedunculatus Pall., it seems to be being evaluated for its seed oil potential.

Notes

References

External links
 

pedunculata
Garden plants
Flora of Siberia
Flora of Mongolia
Flora of China
Plants described in 1883